Quaise, Inc was founded in 2018 to develop a millimeter-wave drilling system for converting existing power stations to use superdeep geothermal energy. The system repurposes existing gyrotron technology to drill 20 kilometers beneath the surface, where temperatures exceed 400 °C. No fracking is required, avoiding the potential for earthquakes that have occurred in other geothermal systems. Drilling using this technique is hoped to be fast, with boreholes aimed to be completed in 100 days using existing 1MW gyrotrons.

Overview 
Existing geothermal power stations can only be deployed in rare locations where adequate heat is located within 3 km of the surface. These resources are of a comparatively low temperature, and require seismically risky stimulation techniques. Further, drilling at these depths is expensive and slow.

Instead, Quaise plans to drill quickly to deep depths using a gyrotron and waveguide, vaporizing the rock by heating it. Temperatures at 20 km depth are above the supercritical point of water, which allows ten times more energy to be transferred given the same volumetric flow. The supercritical water is then used in a supercritical steam generator which may previously have been powered with fossil fuels.

Comparison with other power sources 
The approach proposes advantages compared with other power sources:
 Constant 24-hour generation - Maximum output always available. Does not require storage. Wind and Solar are intermittent generators.
 Small land footprint - Consumes less than 1% of the land area of wind or solar for the same maximum output.
 Instantly dispatchable - Can rapidly change power output to respond to demand.
 Worldwide distribution - Heat source is available everywhere at this depth. Low cost power source available to all countries.
 Zero emissions - No carbon emissions or waste output.
 No fracking - No seismic activity from the borehole, which has previously resulted in earthquakes.
 Zero fuel cost - Does not require ongoing fuel costs, unlike nuclear, coal or gas.
 Green hydrogen - Can generate large quantities of green hydrogen for industrial and transport applications.
 Uses existing workforce - Oil and gas industry workers can operate bore system. Coal, gas and nuclear power station workers can operate and maintain the power stations.
 Uses existing technologies - Existing oil and gas equipment and infrastructure can be used for most of the bore system. Existing thermal power stations have large existing supply chains. Components for using supercritical water are readily available, and have been used in many gas and coal power stations. Multiple companies manufacture gyrotrons worldwide.

Status 
In October 2021, Quaise began initial testing of gyrotron boring at Oak Ridge National Laboratory and plans to have a full-scale gyrotron drilling rig completed by 2024. By 2026, the company hopes to have achieved 100MW of geothermal power output. By 2028, Quaise aims to have converted an existing fossil-fuelled power plant to run on geothermal steam.

See also
 Supercritical steam generator

References

Geothermal energy
Drilling technology
Geothermal drilling